FACTS was a weekly news magazine from Switzerland owned by Tamedia. The weekly published between 1995 and 2007.

History and profile
FACTS was established by Tamedia AG in 1995. The magazine initially oriented itself after the German magazine Focus until it obtained its own profile. It was among the leading news magazines in Switzerland. The magazine was published on a weekly basis in German and was part of Tamedia.

In Spring 2002, the magazine was banned from the planes of the Swiss International Air Lines following the publication of an article criticizing the company.

The main competitor of FACTS was the weekly Weltwoche. In 1997 FACTS had a circulation of 103,424 copies. In 2005, the magazine had a circulation of about 73,000 copies, with a reader reachout of about 440,000 readers.

In 2007 FACTS ceased publication. In September 2007, Tamedia reactivated the website of the discontinued weekly magazine by launching FACTS 2.0. FACTS 2.0 aggregates content from various news sources and presents it in the form of teasers.

See also
 List of magazines in Switzerland

References

External links 
 Facts
 Random Facts
 FACTS 2.0

1995 establishments in Switzerland
2007 disestablishments in Switzerland
Defunct magazines published in Switzerland
German-language magazines
Magazines established in 1995
Magazines disestablished in 2007
Magazines published in Zürich
News magazines published in Europe
Weekly magazines published in Switzerland